Themeda is a genus of plants in the grass family native to Asia, Africa, Australia, and Papuasia. There are about 18 to 26 species, many of which are native to Southeast Asia.

 Species
 Themeda anathera (Nees ex Steud.) Hack. - Afghanistan, Himalayas, Tibet
 Themeda arguens (L.) Hack. - Christmas grass - Sri Lanka, Southeast Asia, Papuasia, northern Australia
 Themeda arundinacea (Roxb.) A.Camus - Indochina, southern China, Indian Subcontinent, Malaysia, Indonesia
 Themeda avenacea (F. Muell.) Maiden & Betche - oat kangaroo grass  - Australia
 Themeda caudata (Nees ex Hook. & Arn.) A.Camus - Indochina, southern China, Himalayas, Malaysia, Indonesia, Philippines
 Themeda cymbaria Hack. - Tamil Nadu, Sri Lanka, Kerala
 Themeda gigantea (Cav.) Hack.  - Southeast Asia, Papuasia, New Caledonia, Vanuatu
 Themeda helferi Hack. -  Myanmar, Andaman Islands, Yunnan
 Themeda hookeri (Griseb.) A.Camus - Tibet, Yunnan, eastern Himalayas
 Themeda huttonensis Bor - Assam
 Themeda idjensis Jansen  - Java Timur, Bali
 Themeda intermedia (Hack.) Bor  - Southeast Asia, China, Indian Subcontinent, Papuasia, Queensland, Vanuatu
 Themeda laxa (Andersson) A.Camus Indian Subcontinent
 Themeda minor L.Liou - Tibet
 Themeda mooneyi Bor - Odisha
 Themeda novoguineensis (Reeder) Jansen - Papua New Guinea, Lesser Sunda Islands 
 Themeda palakkadensis Chorghe, Prasad & Lakshminarasimhan - Kerala
 Themeda pseudotremula Potdar et al. - Maharashtra
 Themeda quadrivalvis- grader grass (L.) Kuntze - Indian Subcontinent,  Myanmar, Andaman Islands; naturalized in Socotra, South Africa, eastern Indochina, Papuasia, Queensland, Mexico, Brazil, Argentina, various islands (Indian and Pacific Oceans, West Indies)
 Themeda sabarimalayana Sreek. & V.J.Nair - India
 Themeda saxicola Bor - Odisha
 Themeda strigosa (Ham. ex Hook.f.) A.Camus - India, Bangladesh
 Themeda tremula (Nees ex Steud.) Hack. - India, Sri Lanka, Bangladesh
 Themeda triandra Forssk.- kangaroo grass, red grass, rooigras  - Africa (from Morocco to KwaZulu-Natal), Asia (from  Yemen to Japan to Maluku), Australia, New Guinea
 Themeda trichiata S.L.Chen & T.D.Zhuang - Guangxi, Yunnan, Hainan
 Themeda unica S.L.Chen & T.D.Zhuang  - Anhui, Zhejiang
 Themeda villosa (Poir.) A.Camus - silky kangaroo grass, Lyon's grass - China, Indian Subcontinent, Indochina, Philippines, Indonesia, New Guinea
 Themeda yunnanensis S.L.Chen & T.D.Zhuang - Yunnan

 Formerly included
See Elymandra, Germainia, Hyparrhenia, Iseilema

References

Andropogoneae
Grasses of Africa
Grasses of Asia
Grasses of Oceania
Poaceae genera